Stoneleigh Historic District is a national historic district at Towson, Baltimore County, Maryland, United States. It is a cohesive residential neighborhood in Central Baltimore County.  The first  section of Stoneleigh was platted in 1922 and later enlarged in 1954 with the central  of land, on which the Italianate-style Stoneleigh Villa once stood. Domestic buildings in Stoneleigh extends from the 1920s to infill housing of the mid 1980s and are suburban examples of the Tudor Revival, Colonial Revival, French Revival, Spanish Mission Revival, Renaissance Revival, and Craftsman styles.

It was added to the National Register of Historic Places in 2003.

See also
Stoneleigh-Rodgers Forge, Maryland, a former Census-designated place enumerated in 1960.

References

External links
 Stoneleigh Community Website, includes history and photos
 , including photo dated 2001, at Maryland Historical Trust
 Boundary Map of the Stoneleigh Historic District, Baltimore County, at Maryland Historical Trust

Historic districts in Baltimore County, Maryland
Colonial Revival architecture in Maryland
Neoclassical architecture in Maryland
Historic districts on the National Register of Historic Places in Maryland
National Register of Historic Places in Baltimore County, Maryland